Indé is the municipal seat of the  municipality of Indé in the Mexican state of Durango. As of 2010, the town had a population of 659.

The village of Indé was founded in 1547.

References

Populated places in Durango
Populated places established in 1547